Lake Town may refer to:
 Lake Town, Kolkata, India
 Lake Town Township, Barnes County, North Dakota, United States
 Lady Bird Lake, formerly Town Lake, a reservoir on the Colorado River in downtown Austin, Texas, United States

Fictional locations
 Lake-town (Esgaroth), a town in The Hobbit by J. R. R. Tolkien

See also 
 Lake (disambiguation)
 Lake City (disambiguation)
 Lake Township (disambiguation)
 Laketown (disambiguation)
 Laketon (disambiguation)
 Towne Lake, Georgia, USA
 Grand Lake Towne, Oklahoma, USA